Wafer backgrinding is a semiconductor device fabrication step during which wafer thickness is reduced to allow stacking and high-density packaging of integrated circuits (IC).

ICs are produced on semiconductor wafers that undergo a multitude of processing steps. The silicon wafers predominantly used today have diameters of 200 and 300 mm. They are roughly 750 μm thick to ensure a minimum of mechanical stability and to avoid warping during high-temperature processing steps.

Smartcards, USB memory sticks, smartphones, handheld music players, and other ultra-compact electronic products would not be feasible in their present form without minimizing the size of their various components along all dimensions. The backside of the wafers are thus ground prior to wafer dicing (separation of the individual microchips). Wafers thinned down to 75 to 50 μm are common today.

Prior to grinding, wafers are commonly laminated with UV-curable back-grinding tape, which ensures against wafer surface damage during back-grinding and prevents wafer surface contamination caused by infiltration of grinding fluid and/or debris. The wafers are also washed with deionized water throughout the process, which helps prevent contamination.

The process is also known as "backlap", "backfinish" or "wafer thinning".

See also  
 Back-illuminated sensor

References

Semiconductor device fabrication